Nyanyano is a community in the Gomoa East District in the Central Region of Ghana. It is located about 20 km south-west of Accra and about 6 km south of Kasoa.

Institutions 

 Nyanyano Police Station
 Mother and Child School

References 

Central Region (Ghana)
Communities in Ghana